Characium is a genus of green algae in the family Characiaceae.

Species list

 C. acuminatum
 C. ambiguum
 C. angustum
 C. astipitatum
 C. braunii
 C. bulgariense
 C. cerassiforme
 C. conicum
 C. epipyxis
 C. giganteum
 C. groenlandicum
 C. guttula
 C. heteromorphum
 C. limneticum
 C. marinum
 C. nasutum
 C. obtusum
 C. ornithocephalum
 C. ovale
 C. polymorphum
 C. prodani
 C. pseudopyriforme
 C. pyriforme
 C. rostratum
 C. saccatum
 C. sieboldii
 C. strictum
 C. substrictum
 C. subulatum
 C. tenue
 C. terrestre
 C. urnigerum
 C. westianum

References

External links

Sphaeropleales genera
Sphaeropleales